Jens Thorén is a former professional Magic: The Gathering player from Sweden. He is best known for winning the 2002 Magic Invitational and finishing in the top 4 of two Pro Tours in a row (San Diego and Osaka) in the 2001–02 season. That season, he also finished second in the Player of the Year race to Kai Budde. He won the Masters tournament in Houston the following season. After winning the Magic Invitational, a version of the card he designed was printed in Mirrodin as Solemn Simulacrum.

Accomplishments

References

External links
 San Diego pro tour
 Osaka pro tour
 Houston tournament
 Solemn Simulacrum

Swedish Magic: The Gathering players
Living people
Year of birth missing (living people)
People from Umeå